Pteronemacheilus is a genus of stone loaches.

Species
There are currently two recognized species in this genus:
 Pteronemacheilus lucidorsum Bohlen & Šlechtová, 2011
 Pteronemacheilus meridionalis (S. Q. Zhu, 1982)

References

Nemacheilidae